Hilarographa gentinga is a species of moth of the family Tortricidae. It is found in Malaysia.

The ground colour of the forewings is brownish cream in the form of lines divided by parallel, oblique, almost straight brownish lines extending from the dorsum. The basal half of the hindwings is pale brownish and the periphery is brown.

Etymology
The specific name refers to the collecting place.

References

Moths described in 2009
Hilarographini